Koenraad is a Dutch given name. Notable persons with that name include:

 Koenraad Degroote (born 1959), Belgian politician
 Koenraad Dillen (born 1964), Belgian politician
 Koenraad Elst (born 1959), Belgian orientalist and Indologist
 Koenraad Logghe (born 1963), Belgian neopagan
 Koenraad Wolter Swart (1916–1992), Dutch-American historian

See also 
 Coenraad
 Koen
 Conrad (name)

Masculine given names
Dutch masculine given names